Ferric Collons (born December 4, 1969) is a National Football League player who played defensive end for the New England Patriots.

References

1969 births
Living people
Sportspeople from Belleville, Illinois
American football defensive ends
California Golden Bears football players
New England Patriots players